Elections to Ballymena Borough Council were held on 30 May 1973 on the same day as the other Northern Irish local government elections. The election used four district electoral areas to elect a total of 21 councillors.

Election results

Districts summary

|- class="unsortable" align="centre"
!rowspan=2 align="left"|Ward
! % 
!Cllrs
! % 
!Cllrs
! %
!Cllrs
! %
!Cllrs
! %
!Cllrs
!rowspan=2|TotalCllrs
|- class="unsortable" align="center"
!colspan=2 bgcolor="" | UUP
!colspan=2 bgcolor="" | DUP
!colspan=2 bgcolor="" | Alliance
!colspan=2 bgcolor="" | Vanguard
!colspan=2 bgcolor="white"| Others
|-
|align="left"|Area A
|bgcolor="40BFF5"|45.3
|bgcolor="40BFF5"|2
|13.6
|1
|2.3
|0
|0.0
|0
|38.8
|1
|4
|-
|align="left"|Area B
|16.0
|1
|39.1
|2
|5.3
|0
|0.0
|0
|bgcolor="DDDDDD"|39.6
|bgcolor="DDDDDD"|3
|6
|-
|align="left"|Area C
|bgcolor="40BFF5"|40.9
|bgcolor="40BFF5"|3
|18.4
|1
|4.5
|0
|22.4
|1
|13.8
|0
|5
|-
|align="left"|Area D
|bgcolor="40BFF5"|50.8
|bgcolor="40BFF5"|3
|22.8
|1
|11.7
|1
|0.0
|0
|14.7
|1
|6
|-
|- class="unsortable" class="sortbottom" style="background:#C9C9C9"
|align="left"| Total
|37.9
|9
|24.2
|5
|6.4
|1
|5.6
|1
|25.9
|5
|21
|-
|}

Districts results

Area A

1973: 2 x UUP, 1 x DUP, 1 x Independent Unionist

Area B

1973: 2 x UUP, 2 x Independent Unionist, 1 x DUP, 1 x Independent

Area C

1973: 3 x UUP, 1 x DUP, 1 x Vanguard

Area D

1973: 3 x UUP, 1 x DUP, 1 x Alliance, 1 x Independent

Data missing from stage 9

References

Ballymena Borough Council elections
Ballymena